The Washington metropolitan area is currently the seventh-largest radio market in the United States. While most stations originate within Washington, D.C. proper, this list includes also stations that originate from Northern Virginia and Annapolis, Maryland.

Currently, radio stations that primarily serve the Washington metropolitan area include:

Broadcast radio

AM stations 

 1 clear-channel station
 2 daytime-only station

FM stations 

Asterisk (*) indicates a non-commercial (public radio/campus/educational) broadcast.

Defunct
 NAA/Arlington, VA (1913–41)
 NOF/Naval Air Station, Anacostia (1920–23)
 WCAP/Washington, D.C. (1926–26; merged into WRC, now WTEM)
 WDM/Washington, D.C. (1921–25)
 WDW/Washington, D.C. (1921–22)
 WINX—WOOK—WFAN/Washington, D.C. (1940–78)
 WHFS/Washington, D.C./Baltimore, MD (1961–2005}
 WJH/Washington, D.C. (1921–24)
 WQAW/Washington, D.C. (1923–24)

References

Bibliography

External links
 Maryland, DC, Delaware Broadcasters Association

Washington, D.C.-related lists
Washington, D.C.